Dyera polyphylla is a tree species in the family Apocynaceae that grows to 60 m tall in peat swamp forests of Sumatra and Borneo.

References

Rauvolfioideae
Vulnerable plants
Trees of Borneo
Trees of Sumatra